Talawanda Springs is an unincorporated community in Preble County, in the U.S. state of Ohio.

Talawanda ("clear water") is the Native American name for nearby Four Mile Creek.

References

Unincorporated communities in Preble County, Ohio
Unincorporated communities in Ohio